William C. Kavanaugh (May 26, 1914 in East Chicago, Indiana – March 8, 1991 in Sun City West, Arizona), was a member of the Wisconsin State Assembly.

Kavanaugh was born on May 26, 1914. He would graduate from Oglethorpe University. During World War II, Kavanaugh served in the United States Army. He died on March 14, 1991.

Political career
Kavanaugh was elected to the Assembly in 1966. Additionally, he was a member of the Clark County, Wisconsin Board of Supervisors and the Greenwood, Wisconsin School Board. He was a Republican.

References

People from East Chicago, Indiana
People from Greenwood, Wisconsin
Republican Party members of the Wisconsin State Assembly
County supervisors in Wisconsin
School board members in Wisconsin
Businesspeople from Wisconsin
Military personnel from Wisconsin
United States Army soldiers
United States Army personnel of World War II
Oglethorpe University alumni
1914 births
1991 deaths
20th-century American businesspeople
20th-century American politicians
People from Sun City West, Arizona